David Smith (born ) is a rugby union footballer who plays at wing for Northampton Saints and England Sevens.

He attended Colchester Royal Grammar School's Sixth Form.

External links
 Northampton Saints Profile

1988 births
Living people
English rugby union players
Northampton Saints players
People educated at Colchester Royal Grammar School